Maher may refer to:

Name 
Maher (given name), an Arabic given name
Maher (surname), list of people with the name

Places 
Maher Island, an Antarctic island
Maher, Colorado, an unincorporated community in the United States
Maher, West Virginia, an unincorporated community in the United States
Maher Building, a historic building in Florida, United States
Mahers, Newfoundland and Labrador, a settlement in Canada

Other uses 
Maher Cup, an Australian rugby league football trophy
Maher (NGO), an Indian non-profit organization
Maher (community), a social group of India
Maher (god), an Aksumite god

See also
Waltons Stores (Interstate) Ltd v Maher, leading case in Australian contract law
Maher v. Town Council of Portland, Canadian constitutional law court decision dealing with the constitutional guarantees for denominational schools
Mehr (disambiguation)
Mahar (tribe) of Sindh and Punjab, Pakistan
Mahir or Maher, Arabic given name